Víctor Ezequiel Salazar (born 26 May 1993) is an Argentine professional footballer who plays as a right-back for Paraguayan Primera División side Club Olimpia.

Career
Salazar joined Rosario Central in 2007. He was promoted into their senior team by manager Miguel Ángel Russo in November 2011, Salazar featured for ninety minutes in a draw with Olimpo which turned out to be Russo's final game in charge. In his opening four campaigns with the club, he featured seventy times in all competitions between 2014 and 2017. On 29 June 2017, Salazar left Rosario Central to play for San Lorenzo. He made his San Lorenzo debut in the Copa Libertadores versus Emelec on 7 July. His league bow came against former team Rosario Central on 10 September, he lasted just forty-three minutes before receiving a red card.

Personal life
Salazar is the brother of fellow footballer Nahuel Salazar. He is married to Xoana Barrientos, a hockey player for Provincial.

Career statistics
.

References

External links

1993 births
Living people
Sportspeople from Tucumán Province
Argentine footballers
Argentine expatriate footballers
Association football defenders
Argentine Primera División players
Paraguayan Primera División players
Rosario Central footballers
San Lorenzo de Almagro footballers
Club Olimpia footballers
Argentine expatriate sportspeople in Paraguay
Expatriate footballers in Paraguay